Ultimate Collection is a 2005 release by the British pop group M People featuring Heather Small. It includes two tracks that were not on the previous The Best of M People album. The album also includes two singles released by Heather Small as a solo artist.

Small's solo single, "Proud", was re-released to coincide with the release of this album and for the London Olympic bid.

Track listing

Remix album

The album was released as a remix album and includes ten of M People's greatest hits remixed by Sasha, Joey Negro and K-Klass among others.

References

2005 greatest hits albums
M People compilation albums